This is a round-up of the 1969 Sligo Senior Football Championship. Collooney/Ballisodare were champions again, and as in 1967 they defeated the holders, this time St. Patrick's, in the final. This was the seventh title won by the parish in the 1960s, but this was also to be the last such triumph to date.

First round

Quarter-finals

Semi-finals

Sligo Senior Football Championship Final

References

 Sligo Champion (Autumn 1969)

Sligo Senior Football Championship
Sligo